The Commemorative Air Force (CAF), formerly known as the Confederate Air Force, is an American non-profit organization based in Dallas, Texas, that preserves and shows historical aircraft at airshows, primarily in the U.S. and Canada.

The CAF has about 13,000 members, over 70 units, and over 170 aircraft, including the world's largest collection of airworthy warbirds.

History
The origin of the Commemorative Air Force is the organization called the "Confederate Air Corps" created by Oscar Harper in Montgomery, Alabama, in 1953. Led by the fictional character "Thaddeus P. Throckmorton" and his recruiting officer "Jethro Culpepper", the CAC established several features that later became key characteristics of the CAF: folksy, tongue-in-cheek southern humor; a membership structure based on each member having the equal rank of colonel; and a rallying cry of "Semper, Mint Julep" ("Always Mint Julep").

In 1957, Lloyd Nolen and four friends purchased a P-51 Mustang, each sharing in the $1,500 cost of the aircraft. With the purchase of the Mustang, known as "Red Nose", the group that became the CAF was unofficially founded. In 1958, the group made their second purchase of two Grumman F8F Bearcats for $805 each. Along with the P-51, this gave the pilots the two most-advanced piston-engine fighters to see service with the U.S. Army Air Forces and the United States Navy.

In 1960, the CAF began to seriously search for other World War II aircraft. The CAF colonels were shocked to find that the aircraft which played such a major role in winning World War II were being rapidly and systematically scrapped as obsolete with no efforts, not even by the Air Force or Navy, to preserve any for display for future generations. The warbirds that remained airworthy were mostly in private hands modified for air racing or had been converted for commercial use as air freighters and aerial firefighters.

On September 6, 1961, the CAF was chartered as a nonprofit Texas corporation to restore and preserve World War II-era combat aircraft. By the end of the year, there were nine aircraft in the CAF fleet. By 1963, the group had achieved their initial goal of acquiring one of each American World War II fighter plane. Their first airshow was held on March 10, 1963.

In 1965, the first museum building was completed at old Rebel Field, Mercedes, Texas. The CAF created a new Rebel Field at Harlingen, Texas when they moved there in 1968, occupying three large buildings including  of museum space. The CAF fleet continued to grow. By the end of the decade, the CAF fleet included medium and heavy bombers such as the North American B-25 Mitchell, B-17, Consolidated B-24 Liberator. In 1971, they added one of the two airworthy Boeing B-29 Superfortresses, FIFI.

In 1976, the CAF sponsored an air show where a B-29 bomber piloted by Paul Tibbets, the pilot who flew the B-29 which bombed Hiroshima during World War II, reenacted the atomic bombing of Hiroshima (including a mock mushroom cloud). This air show prompted the Japanese government to lodge a formal complaint with the United States Embassy, resulting in the U.S. government issuing an apology.

In 1983, the American Airpower Heritage Foundation was founded to financially support the CAF.

The group's accomplishments were recognized in 1989 when it became a National Aviation Hall of Fame Spirit of Flight Award winner. It was also honored that year when Texas Governor William Clements signed a resolution naming the CAF the air force of Texas.

In 1990, the CAF added two more corporations. The first was the American Airpower Heritage Flying Museum, tasked with obtaining and maintaining the CAF's aircraft titles. The second was the American Airpower Heritage Museum, which acquired and maintained the CAF's non-aircraft pieces and static displays.

 1991 saw the CAF moving operations to Midland, Texas. Once in Midland, the group opened its museum facilities as the CAF Airpower Museum and the American Combat Airman Hall of Fame.

In April 2014, the CAF announced the move of their headquarters and all of the planes associated with the headquarters to Dallas Executive Airport in Dallas, Texas. The museum and its artifacts (including the nose art collection) were moved to the new headquarters in Dallas, where it operates as the Henry B. Tippie National Aviation Education Center (NAEC).

In 2015, the CAF acquired the C-47 That's All, Brother, the plane that led the main airborne invasion of Normandy during D-Day.

Accidents and incidents
On September 28, 1995, a Martin B-26 Marauder operated by CAF crashed near Odessa, Texas, killing all five crew members. The NTSB found that the pilot failed to maintain minimum airspeed.

On April 14, 2001, the CAF pilot of a Fairchild PT-19A was killed in a crash shortly after takeoff at Midland International Airport; the plane's one passenger survived. The NTSB cited the pilot's "failure to maintain airspeed which resulted in an inadvertent stall".

On May 14, 2001, both CAF crew members aboard a Vultee BT-13A died in a crash southeast of Odessa, Texas. The NTSB found that the pilot failed to maintain minimum airspeed.

On June 16, 2005, a PT-26 Cornell operated by CAF crashed in Williamson, Georgia, killing both crew members. The NTSB found that the pilot "attempted a takeoff with flaps extended."

On November 12, 2022, during the Wings Over Dallas airshow, two planes owned and operated by CAF—a Bell P-63F and the Boeing B-17G Texas Raiders—suffered a mid-air collision resulting in six fatalities.

Membership
Today, the Commemorative Air Force comprises over 12,000 members, including more than seventy regional groups, called wings or detachments, in twenty-seven states and four other countries. Several hundred members actively serve as pilots and flight and/or maintenance crew members committed to preserving American combat aviation heritage. The CAF is an all-volunteer organization, made up of members from all backgrounds. Membership is open to everyone age 18 or older, and cadet membership is available for those over 12 years of age. Although a 501(c)(3) nonprofit, tax-exempt group, the CAF has received financial incentives from state and local governments related to its Dallas relocation as well as its time in Midland.

Organization
The American Airpower Heritage Group is the parent organization and is made up of four separate corporations:
 The Commemorative Air Force, which is the membership association
 A foundation, which controls the financial assets and endowment
 A museum, which manages the non-flying artifacts
 A flying museum, which operates the flying aircraft

Name
The original name, Confederate Air Force, alluding to the Confederate States of America, started as a simple tongue-in-cheek joke, poking fun at the organization's ragtag beginnings. As the collection of warbirds at Central Valley Airport in Mercedes, Texas, started to grow, someone painted the name on the side of the original North American P-51 Mustang Red Nose. The name stuck, and it grew to the point where the airport was renamed Rebel Field, all members were called "colonels" (a tradition which still remains), and it led to the creation of a fictitious leader named Colonel Jethro E. Culpepper. There was even a humorous CAF twist put to the old AVG Flying Tigers World War II "blood chit" that read, "This foreign person has come to China to help in the war effort. Soldiers and civilians, one and all, should rescue, protect, and provide him medical care." The CAF version seen on the backs of flight suits and flight jackets stated, "This is a CAF aviator. If found lost or unconscious, please hide him from Yankees, revive with mint julep and assist him in returning to friendly territory. CONFEDERATE AIR FORCE."

In November 2000, the group voted to rename, using the initials "CAF" until a permanent name was selected. Following a 2001 membership vote, the group changed its name to "Commemorative Air Force", effective January 1, 2002. Many felt the name Confederate Air Force was confusing, did not accurately reflect the purpose of the organization, and was detrimental to fundraising efforts. According to CAF chief of staff Ray Kinney, "In many people's minds, the word 'confederacy' brings up the image of slavery and discrimination. We, in no way, are associated with that kind of stuff. So, it gives us, in a way, a black eye."

Aircraft

, the CAF owns 179 aircraft. The entire collection of CAF aircraft is known as the CAF Ghost Squadron. Its aircraft range from the small Stinson L-5 Sentinel and Ryan PT-22 to the giant Boeing B-29 Superfortress; the Boeing B-17 Flying Fortress; and the Consolidated  Liberator B Mk I/B-24A Liberator AM927. Many of the CAF aircraft are rare - the CAF operates one of only two flying examples of the historic Boeing B-29 Superfortress, and the only remaining flightworthy Curtiss SB2C Helldiver. Others, such as the B-24/LB-30 Liberator; the Japanese Mitsubishi A6M Zero; and the Douglas SBD Dauntless are one of only two or three of that type left flying today. The CAF also operates Axis and Warsaw Pact aircraft such as the MiG 17 Fresco C.

Aeronca L-3E Defender LIL' Show Me
Aeronca L-16A - Airbase Arizona
Aichi D3A Val dive bomber replica (North American SNJ conversion)
Beechcraft 18/C-45/SNB/JRB
Beech AT-11 Kansan
Beechcraft D-18S A-235 - Airbase Arizona
Beechcraft UC-45J Navigator 51242 - Central Texas Wing
Beech T-34A Mentor (A-45)
Bell P-39Q Airacobra 42-19597 - Central Texas Wing
Bell P-63
Bell P-63A-6-BE Kingcobra 42-68941 - Airbase Georgia
Boeing-Stearman PT-17 Kaydet (USN N2S)
Stearman N2S-4  c/n 75-4894 - Airbase Arizona
Stearman N2S c/n 75-8291 - Utah Wing
Boeing B-17 Flying Fortress
Boeing B-17G Flying Fortress Sentimental Journey 44-83514 - Airbase Arizona
Boeing B-29 Superfortress ''Fifi' 44-62070
CASA 352L (Spanish-built Junkers Ju 52) German bomber/transport
Cessna UC-94/C-165 (Airmaster)
Cessna UC-78 Bobcat (RCAF Crane) 1632 - Wright Stuff Squadron
Cessna UC-78B Bobcat 43-32578 - Jayhawk Wing
Consolidated B-24A/LB-30/Liberator I/C-87 40-2366 Diamond Lil (ex-RAF AM927)
Consolidated PBY-6A Catalina BuNo 64092 - Lake Superior Squadron
Consolidated PBY-6A Catalina BuNo 64097 - Lake Superior Squadron
Curtiss C-46F-1-CU Commando China Doll 44-78663 - Southern California Wing 
Curtiss P-40 Warhawk (Kittyhawk and Tomahawk)
Curtiss P-40N Warhawk c/n 29629 (ex-RCAF 867)
Curtiss SB2C-5 Helldiver BuNo 83589 - Cactus Squadron/West Texas Wing
De Havilland DH-94 Moth Minor c/n N94DH - Rio Grande Valley Wing
de Havilland Canada DHC-1 Chipmunk
Douglas A-26/B-26 Invader
Douglas A-26B-35DL Invader Spirit of Waco 41-39427 - CAF Invader Squadron
Douglas A-26C-40DT Invader Daisy Mae 44-35643 - Sierra Hotel A-26 Group
Douglas A-26C Invader Lady Liberty 41-39230 - Lady Liberty Squadron
Douglas B-23 Dragon on display at CAF Headquarters
Douglas DC-3/C-47/C-53/R4D
Douglas C-47B Skytrain The Black Sparrow 44-77013 (USN R4D-7) - Great Lakes Wing
Douglas C-47 Skytrain That's All, Brother 42-92847 – Texas Wing
Douglas C-53D-DO/DC-3A Skytrooper D-Day Doll 42-68830 - Inland Empire Wing
Douglas R4D-6/C-47J Skytrain Ready 4 Duty BuNo 50783 - Dallas/Fort Worth Wing
Douglas SBD-5 Dauntless BuNo 54532 
ERCO Ercoupe
Fairchild PT-19, PT-23 and PT-26
Fairchild PT-19A - Southern California Wing
Fairchild PT-19A 42-83435 - Birmingham Escadrille
Fairchild PT-23A-HO 42-49250 - Southern California Wing
Fairchild PT-26 - Wisconsin Wing
Fairchild Cornell  42-65935 - Highland Lakes Squadron
Fairchild UC-61 Argus/Forwarder
Fairchild F-12R46 Argus - Southern California Wing
Fairchild F-12R Argus - High Sky Wing (painted as J2K)

Fleet 16B Finch c/n 383 - Rio Grande Valley Wing
Focke-Wulf Fw 44J Stieglitz RF+GJ - Rio Grande Valley Wing
Goodyear FG-1D Corsair 530 BuNo 92468 - CAF Corsair Sponsor Group, Airbase Georgia
Grumman AF-2S Guardian BuNo 126731 - Airbase Arizona
Grumman Avenger
Grumman/General Motors TBM-3E Avenger BuNo 53353 - Missouri Wing
Grumman/General Motors TBM-3S Avenger BuNo 53503 - Rocky Mountain Wing
Grumman/General Motors TBM-3S Avenger BuNo 91426 -  National Capital Squadron
Grumman/General Motors FM-2 Wildcat BuNo 86819 - Airbase Arizona
Grumman F6F-5 Hellcat Minsi III - Southern California Wing
Grumman F8F-2 Bearcat BuNo 122674 - Southern California Wing
Grumman S-2B Tracker BuNo 136404 - Old Dominion Squadron (status unknown, crashed 2007)
Hawker Sea Fury FB.10 c/n 41H-696792 (ex Royal Navy WJ288) - Memphis Squadron
Interstate L-6 Grasshopper

Lockheed C-60 Lodestar 
Lockheed Model 18-50 Lodestar c/n 18-2274 - Hampton Roads, Virginia, painted as 255884
Lockheed C-60 Lodestar Goodtime Gal 42-56005 c/n 18-2478 - Houston Wing	
Lockheed PV-2 Harpoon
Lockheed T-33 Shooting Star
McDonnell Douglas F-4N Phantom II BuNo 153016 - Airbase Arizona
Messerschmitt Bf 108 Taifun German liaison/trainer
Mikoyan-Gurevich MiG-15UTI 012 - Airbase Arizona
Mikoyan-Gurevich MiG-15bis 4415 - Airbase Arizona
Mikoyan-Gurevich MiG-17 - Airbase Arizona
Mikoyan-Gurevich MiG-21PF Fishbed-D 507 - Airbase Arizona
Mitsubishi A6M3 Model 22 Zero Japanese carrier fighter - Southern California Wing
Mitsubishi Zero fighter replica (North American Harvard conversion)
Morane-Saulnier MS-502 painted as Fieseler Fi 156 Storch - s/n 361 Delaware Valley Wing
Nakajima B5N Kate torpedo bomber replica (Vultee BT-13 Valiant conversion)
Naval Aircraft Factory N3N-3 - West Houston Squadron
Naval Aircraft Factory N3N-3 N4009A - High Sierra Squadron 
North American AT-6 Texan (USN SNJ, RAF Harvard, various models)
North American Harvard II c/n 81-4099 - Inland Empire Wing
North American SNJ-4 Texan c/n 88-13041 - Buffalo Heritage Squadron
North American SNJ-4 Texan c/n 88-13517 - Highland Lakes Squadron
North American SNJ-4 Texan c/n 88-10177 - Southern California Wing
North American SNJ-5 Texan c/n 88-16676/42-84895/BuNo 84865 - Southern California Wing
North American SNJ-5 Texan BuNo 90725 - Airbase Arizona
North American SNJ-6 Texan BuNo 112180 - Minnesota Wing
North American B-25 Mitchell
North American B-25J-5NC Yellow Rose 43-27868 - Central Texas Wing
North American B-25J-10NC Maid in the Shade 43-35972 - Airbase Arizona
North American B-25J-20NC Miss Mitchell 44-29869 - Minnesota Wing
North American PBJ-1J-30NC Semper Fi 44-30988 - Southern California Wing
North American B-25J-30NC Show Me 44-31385 - Missouri Wing
North American B-25J-32NC Devil Dog 44-86758 - Devil Dog Squadron
North American NA-64 Yale (painted as BT-14)
North American P-51 Mustang
North American P-51C-10NT Mustang Tuskegee Airmen 42-103645 - Red Tail Squadron
North American P-51D-25-NA Mustang Man-O-War 44-72739 - Southern California Wing 
North American P-51D-25-NA Mustang Red Nose 44-73843 - Airbase Georgia
North American T-28 Trojan
Piper L-4F
Republic P-47N-5RE Thunderbolt 44-88548 - Airbase Georgia (under restoration)
Ryan PT-22 Recruit
Ryan PT-22 Recruit 41-1902 - Minnesota Wing
Ryan L-17 Navion
Ryan Navion A N444AC - Highland Lakes Squadron
Sikorsky UH-19D-2-Sl Chickasaw 54-1416 helicopter
Schweizer TG-3A training glider - Airbase Arizona
Stinson AT-19 Reliant (Royal Navy) - Carolinas Wing
Stinson 108 (World War II Civil Air Patrol)
Stinson L-5 Sentinel (USN/Marines OY)
Stinson L-5E-1VW/OY-2 Sentinel Carin' Belle 44-18143/BuNo 04013 - Ohio Valley Wing
Stinson L-5 Sentinel c/n 76-0272 - Dallas/Fort Worth Wing
Stinson L-5 Sentinel Frozen Assets 42-98667 - Minnesota Wing
Stinson L-9B Reliant
Supermarine Spitfire FR Mk.XIVe NH749 - Southern California Wing
Taylorcraft L-2
Vultee BT-13/BT-15/SNV
Vultee BT-13A 41-11538 - Minnesota Wing
Vultee BT-13A Valiant
Vultee BT-13A 41-21178 - Gulf Coast Wing
Yakovlev Yak-3UA - Southern California Wing

AIRSHO

AIRSHO is a yearly event at Midland International Airport showcasing the CAF's aircraft. Because its aircraft tend to be spread out over large geographic distances, and most Ghost Squadron aircraft rarely fly more than a few hours from their home base, AIRSHO is also an opportunity for CAF members to meet up. Ghost Squadron aircraft usually attend AIRSHO every other year. The CAF AIRSHO is the largest warbird air show in the world, with more than eighty warbirds flying per show.

Wings and squadrons
The CAF has many wings and squadrons. Starting in 2013, a limited number of larger units may be designated as an "airbase." The first is Airbase Arizona, located at Falcon Field in Mesa, Arizona and redesignated in June 2013. Most CAF units are in the United States, but there are three outside the country.

US wings and squadrons

Alabama
Birmingham — Birmingham Escadrille
Alaska
Anchorage — Col Hunt Alaska Wing
Arkansas
Little Rock — Razorback Wing
Arizona
Mesa — Airbase Arizona at Falcon Field
California
Camarillo — Southern California Wing
Modesto — Central California Valley Squadron
Oakland — Golden Gate Wing
Riverside — Inland Empire Wing
Sacramento — Sacramento Delta Squadron
San Diego — Group One Wing
Upland — FM-2 Wildcat Sponsor Group
Colorado
Broomfield — Mile High Wing
Grand Junction — Rocky Mountain Wing
Florida
DeLand — Florida Wing
Pensacola — Floribama Wing
Shalimar — T-33 Sponsor Group
Georgia
Peachtree City — Dixie Wing
Idaho
Caldwell — Idaho Wing
Indiana
Indianapolis — Indiana Wing
Iowa
Council Bluffs — Great Plains Wing
Kansas
Kansas City — Heart of America Wing
Wichita — Jayhawk Wing
Louisiana
New Orleans — Big Easy Wing
Minnesota
Red Wing — Red Tail Squadron
South St. Paul — Minnesota Wing
Mississippi
Madison — Mississippi Wing
Missouri
St. Charles — Missouri Wing
Montana
Bozeman — Big Sky Wing
Nevada
Las Vegas — Nevada Wing
Reno — High Sierra Squadron
New Jersey
Forked River — Delaware Valley Wing
New Mexico
Albuquerque — Lobo Wing
Oklahoma
Enid — Lady Liberty Squadron
Guymon — Cimmaron Strip Wing
Oklahoma City — Oklahoma Wing
Oklahoma City — Sierra Hotel Sponsor Group
Tulsa — Spirit of Tulsa Squadron
South Dakota
Sioux Falls — Joe Foss Squadron
Tennessee
Memphis — Delta Blues Squadron/Memphis Squadron
Texas
Aransas Pass — Maxine Flourney 3rd Coast Squadron
Brownsville — Rio Grande Valley Wing
Burnet — Highland Lakes Squadron
Conroe — Gulf Coast Wing
Corsicana — Coyote Squadron
Dallas — P-40 Sponsor Group
Dallas — Redbird Squadron
Dallas — Training Detachment One
Dallas — WASP Squadron
Fort Worth — B-29/B-24 Squadron
Fort Worth — Invader Squadron
Gainesville — Ground Forces Detachment
Georgetown — Devil Dog Squadron
Graham — Cactus Squadron
Houston — Houston Wing
Lancaster — Dallas/Fort Worth Wing
Marshall — Lone Star Wing
Midland — Blastards Detachment
Midland — High Sky Wing
Midland — West Texas Wing
Odessa — Desert Squadron
Pearland — Tora Sponsor Group
San Antonio — Tex Hill Wing
San Marcos — Centex Wing
Utah
Heber — Utah Wing
Virginia
Franklin — Old Dominion Squadron
Culpeper — Capital Wing
Washington
Everett — Rainier Squadron
Wisconsin
Janesville — Tri-State CAF Wing
Superior — Lake Superior Squadron
Waukesha — Wisconsin Wing
National units
EOD Detachment
Marshalling Detachment
Security Detachment

International wings and squadrons
France
Saint-Ange-le-Viel — French Wing
New Zealand
Auckland — New Zealand Wing
Switzerland
Olten — Swiss Wing

References

Notes

Bibliography

 
 Ogden, Bob. Aviation Museums & Collections of North America. London: Air-Britain, 2007. .

External links

Commemorative Air Force official site
Aerial Visuals Search Commemorative Air Force
AirNav, FlightAware - Old Reb Airport information

United States military aircraft
Air shows in the United States
Aviation organizations based in the United States
Museum organizations
1957 establishments in the United States
Removed Confederate States of America monuments and memorials